The Sixteenth Federal Electoral District of the Federal District (XVI Distrito Electoral Federal del Distrito Federal) is one of the 300 Electoral Districts into which Mexico is divided for the purpose of elections to the federal Chamber of Deputies and one of 27 such districts in the Federal District ("DF" or Mexico City).

It elects one deputy to the lower house of Congress for each three-year legislative period, by means of the first past the post system.

District territory
Under the 2005 districting scheme, the DF's Sixteenth District covers the northern portion of
the borough (delegación) of Álvaro Obregón.

Previous districting schemes

1996–2005 district
Between 1996 and 2005, the 16th District was located in the borough of Álvaro Obregón, but covered only one half of its current territory.

Deputies returned to Congress from this district

XLIII Legislature
 1955–1958: Luis M. Farías (PRI)
L Legislature
 1976–1979: Alfonso Argudín Laria (PRI)
LI Legislature
 1979–1982: Jorge Flores Vizcarra (PRI)
LII Legislature
 1982–1985: José Aguilar Alcérreca (PRI)
LIII Legislature
 1985–1988:
LIV Legislature
 1988–1991: José Arturo Ocampo Villalobos (PAN)
LV Legislature
 1991–1994:
LVI Legislature
 1994–1997: Víctor Manuel Rubio (PRI)
LVII Legislature
 1997–2000: Francisco de Souza (PRD)
LVIII Legislature
 2000–2003: Carlos Alberto Flores Gutiérrez (PAN)
LIX Legislature
 2003–2006: Víctor Suárez Carrera (PRD)
LX Legislature
 2006–2009: Valentina Batres Guadarrama (PRD)

References and notes

Federal electoral districts of Mexico
Mexico City
Federal Electoral District 16